Georg Karl Wilhelm Hamel (12 September 1877 – 4 October 1954) was a German mathematician with interests in mechanics, the foundations of mathematics and function theory.

Biography
Hamel was born in Düren, Rhenish Prussia. He studied at Aachen, Berlin, Göttingen, and Karlsruhe. His doctoral adviser was David Hilbert. He taught at Brünn in 1905, Aachen in 1912, and at the Technical University of Berlin in 1919. In 1927, Hamel studied the size of the key space for the Kryha encryption device. He was an Invited Speaker of the ICM in 1932 at Zurich and in 1936 at Oslo. He was the author of several important treatises on mechanics. He became a member of the Prussian Academy of Sciences in 1938 and the Bavarian Academy of Sciences in 1953. He died in Landshut, Bavaria.

Selected publications
 ("On the geometries in which the straight lines are the shortest", Hamel's doctoral dissertation on Hilbert's fourth problem. A version may be found in Mathematische Annalen 57, 1903.)

See also
 Hamel basis
 Hamel dimension
 Cauchy's functional equation
 Hilbert's fourth problem

References

1877 births
1954 deaths
19th-century German mathematicians
20th-century German mathematicians
Members of the Prussian Academy of Sciences
Modern cryptographers
People from the Rhine Province
RWTH Aachen University alumni
Academic staff of RWTH Aachen University
Humboldt University of Berlin alumni
University of Göttingen alumni
Karlsruhe Institute of Technology alumni
Academic staff of the Technical University of Berlin
German cryptographers
Fluid dynamicists
Linear algebraists
Members of the German Academy of Sciences at Berlin